Tritonoturris scalaris is a species of sea snail, a marine gastropod mollusk in the family Raphitomidae.

This species was placed in this genus in 2010 by Baoquan Li, Xinzheng Li, and Richard N. Kilburn.

Description
The length of the shell varies between 12 mm and 17 mm.

The ribs are rounded, running into the suture, like the lamellae of Scalaria, closely transversely striate. The whorls are convex, with well-impressed sutures. The color of the shell is light yellowish brown, with a narrow indistinct chestnut zone below the middle of the body whorl.

Distribution
This marine species occurs in the South China Sea and off Western Thailand to Indonesia

References

 Hinds. Proc. Zool. Soc., 1843, p. 39. Moll. Voy. Sulph., p. 18, pi. 6, f. 2,

External links
 Li B.-Q. [Baoquan & Li X.-Z. [Xinzheng] (2014) Report on the Raphitomidae Bellardi, 1875 (Mollusca: Gastropoda: Conoidea) from the China Seas. Journal of Natural History 48(17-18): 999-1025]
 
 Gastropods.com: Tritonoturris scalaris

scalaris
Gastropods described in 1843